Hugo Casillas  (born December 8, 1981, in Guadalajara, Jalisco) is a Mexican soccer player who currently plays defense for Anaheim Bolts of the Professional Arena Soccer League.

References 

Player Profile at the California Victory website
Official Website

1985 births
Living people
Footballers from Guadalajara, Jalisco
Association football defenders
Mexican footballers
Tecos F.C. footballers
California Victory players
Murciélagos FC footballers
Club Universidad Nacional footballers
Professional Arena Soccer League players
Mexican expatriate footballers
Expatriate soccer players in the United States
Mexican expatriate sportspeople in the United States